Sign of Truth is the first album by Swedish/German power metal band Dionysus. It was recorded at the Röhn Studio in Fulda, Germany, which is best known for its productions with Edguy and Avantasia, by Tobias Sammet and mixed by Tommy Newton (Keeper of the Seven Keys, Part 1 & 2).

HammerFall singer Joacim Cans worked with Dionysus on the album, and also wrote the lyrics of "Bringer of Salvation" and "Bringer of War" on their second album, Anima Mundi.

Track listing
 "Time Will Tell" – 5:05
 "Sign of Truth" – 5:34
 "Bringer of Salvation" – 4:35
 "Pouring Rain" – 5:23
 "Anthem (for the Children)" – 5:39
 "Holy War" – 5:27
 "Don't Forget" – 6:05
 "Walk on Fire" – 5:58
 "Never Wait" – 5:50
 Bonus Tracks
10. "Loaded Gun" – 5:12
11. "Key into the Past" (Japanese Bonus) – 5:19

Personnel
 Olaf Hayer – vocals
 Johnny Öhlin – guitar
 Nobby Noberg – bass
 Ronny Milianowicz – drums
 Kaspar Daklqvist – keyboard

2002 albums
Dionysus (band) albums
AFM Records albums